The 2007 Petit Le Mans was the eleventh round of the 2007 American Le Mans Series season and tenth running of the Petit Le Mans. It took place at Road Atlanta, Georgia on October 6, 2007. This race also marked the closest finish in Petit Le Mans history, with the top two finishers being separated by 0.923 seconds after the  race.

Audi driver Emanuele Pirro was initially going to drive the No. 2 entry, but suffered a concussion due to an accident in practice a few days earlier. Due to his inability to drive, Audi factory driver Lucas Luhr moved from the Petersen/White Lightning entry to take the seat in the Audi R10 TDI.

Unofficial results
Class winners in bold.  Cars failing to complete 75% of winner's distance marked as Not Classified (NC).

Statistics
 Pole Position - No. 2 Audi Sport North America - 1:08.906
Note - #2 Audi did not start the race from the pole position due to a tire change, which placed it at the back of the field.
 Fastest Lap - No. 1 Audi Sport North America - 1:09.195

References

P
Petit Le Mans